The 2015 Wilmington Hammerheads season will be the club's nineteenth season of competitive soccer, and their fifth consecutive season since their one-year hiatus in 2010.

Non-competitive

Pre-season

Competitions

USL Pro

Table 
Eastern Conference

Results summary

Results by matchday

Matches

U.S. Open Cup

Statistics

Appearances and goals 

|}

Transfers

In

References 

Wilmington Hammerheads FC seasons
Wilmington
Wilmington
2015 in North Carolina